This is a list of hospitals in Mandalay, Myanmar.

Public hospitals
 Mandalay Central Women's Hospital

 550 Bed Mandalay Children's Hospital

 300 Bed Children's Hospital

 Mandalay EENT Hospital

 Mandalay General Hospital

 Mandalay Infectious Diseases Hospital
 Mandalay Mental Health Hospital
 Mandalay Traditional Medicine Hospital

 300 Beded Mandalay Training Hospital

 Mandalay Tuberculosis Hospital
 Mandalay Workers' Hospital

 Mandalay Orthopaedics Hospital
University Hospital, Mandalay

Mandalay